Allan Glaser is an American film producer known for the feature films Lust in the Dust and Tab Hunter Confidential.

Early life 
Glaser was born in Norfolk, Virginia. While attending the University of Southern California, he was employed by 20th Century Fox Television on such shows as M*A*S*H, Trapper John, M.D., and Dynasty.

Production career and Tab Hunter 
Glaser ultimately became director of acquisitions of feature films at 20th Century Fox. It was while in this position he met Tab Hunter. The two formed Fox Run Productions and produced the film Lust in the Dust starring Hunter, Divine, & Lainie Kazan. Released in 1985, the film was a hit and landed Glaser a production deal back at Fox on his next film, Sorority Confidential., written by Patricia Resnick, writer of the film 9 to 5. 
Glaser's next film, Dark Horse, was based on a story by Hunter. The feature starred Mimi Rogers and Ed Begley, Jr. It premiered at the Cannes Film Festival.

Glaser talked Hunter into writing his autobiography, Tab Hunter Confidential, which became a New York Times bestseller. Glaser turned the book into a critically acclaimed documentary in 2015, also entitled Tab Hunter Confidential. In June 2018, The Hollywood Reporter announced that Glaser would produce a feature film for Paramount Pictures based on the documentary with Bad Robot Productions/J.J. Abrams tentatively entitled Tab & Tony.

Between his feature film work, Glaser has worked as a production executive for several major studios.

Personal life 

Glaser and Tab Hunter began a relationship in 1983 and remained together for the next 35 years until Hunter's death in July 2018. They were married in 2013.

References

External links 
 Allan Glaser on IMDb

American film producers
LGBT producers
People from Norfolk, Virginia
Living people
Year of birth missing (living people)
21st-century LGBT people